Salix chlorolepis, also known as the green-scaled willow, is a species of willow. It is endemic to Mount Albert and its surroundings in Quebec, Canada. It is listed as critically imperiled by NatureServe.

References 

Endemic flora of Canada
chlorolepis